Sarah Crawford is an American politician and nonprofit executive. She currently serves as a member of the North Carolina House of Representatives, having represented the 66th district (including constituents in Wake County) since 2023. She previously served in the North Carolina Senate from 2021 to 2023, representing the 18th district (which includes parts of Franklin and Wake counties).

From 2011 to 2015, Crawford worked as Director of Development and Public Relations for the Tammy Lynn Center, a nonprofit organization serving people with intellectual and developmental disabilities. She then served as National Director for Single Stop, a national nonprofit that helps individuals achieve economic prosperity by connecting them to benefits and resources, before returning to the Tammy Lynn Center as its Chief Executive Officer in 2020.

Electoral history

2022

2020

2014

References

External links
North Carolina General Assembly Website

|-

Democratic Party members of the North Carolina House of Representatives
Democratic Party North Carolina state senators
People from Wake County, North Carolina
Living people
21st-century American politicians
21st-century American women politicians
Women state legislators in North Carolina
Year of birth missing (living people)
North Carolina State University alumni